Tonight at Noon is an album by the jazz bassist and composer Charles Mingus, released on the Atlantic label in 1964. It compiles tracks recorded at two sessions – the 1957 sessions for the album entitled The Clown and the 1961 sessions for Oh Yeah but is considered a studio album. These tracks have since been added to the CD re-releases of their respective albums as bonus tracks.

Reception 
The AllMusic review by Thom Jurek stated: "While the former session features Mingus going for the blues via European harmonics and melodic approaches with hard bop tempos (particularly on the title track), the latter session with its nocturnal elegance and spatial irregularities comes off more as some kind of exercise in vanguard Ellington with sophisticated harmonies that give way to languid marches and gospel-tinged blues... Despite the fact that this is an assembled album, it holds plenty of magic nonetheless".

Track listing 
All compositions by Charles Mingus
 "Tonight at Noon" – 6:00 
 "Invisible Lady" – 4:51 
 ""Old" Blues for Walt's Torin" [aka "Roland Kirk's Message"]– 7:57 
 "Peggy's Blue Skylight" – 9:46 
 "Passions of a Woman Loved" – 9:47
Recorded at Atlantic Studios in New York City on March 13, 1957 (tracks 1 & 5) and November 6, 1961

Personnel 
 Charles Mingus – bass, piano, vocals
 Jimmy Knepper – trombone
 Shafi Hadi (as Curtis Porter) (tracks 1 & 5) - alto saxophone
 Booker Ervin (tracks 2–4) – tenor saxophone
 Roland Kirk – tenor saxophone, manzello, stritch, siren, flute (tracks 2–4)
 Wade Legge – piano (tracks 1 & 5)
 Doug Watkins – bass (tracks 2–4)
 Dannie Richmond – drums

References

External links 
Text of the Adrian Henri poem:Tonight at Noon:here

Charles Mingus albums

Atlantic Records albums
Albums produced by Joel Dorn